Mikhail Mikhailovich Yudin (18 January 1976 – 22 March 2020) was a Russian professional football player.

Club career
He played 8 seasons in the Russian Football National League for 5 different clubs.

External links

References

1976 births
2020 deaths
Sportspeople from Lipetsk
Russian footballers
Association football defenders
Russia youth international footballers
FC Kuban Krasnodar players
FC Spartak Tambov players
FC Metallurg Lipetsk players
FC Oryol players
FC Arsenal Tula players
FC Saturn Ramenskoye players
FC Novokuznetsk players
FC Amur Blagoveshchensk players